Pavel Lefterov (Bulgarian: Павел Лефтеров; born 12 November 1997) is a Bulgarian Racing Driver, who currently is racing in Audi Sport TT Cup in the 2016 season.

Career

GT4 European Series
In 2015 he join GT4 European Series. Lefterov finished on his class podium in his first ever car race. He got his first overall win on Circuit de Spa-Francorchamps by winning both races. In the following races on Nürburgring and Misano World Circuit Marco Simoncelli he finished both first races second, and won the second races.

Audi Sport TT Cup
Following the success in his debut season in GT4, Lefterov decided to join Audi Sport TT Cup for the following season.

Racing record

Career summary

† Guest driver ineligible to score points

Complete GT4 European Series results
(key) (Races in bold indicate pole position) (Races in italics indicate fastest lap)

References

External links
 

1997 births
Living people
Bulgarian racing drivers
Sportspeople from Varna, Bulgaria
Audi Sport TT Cup drivers
Nürburgring 24 Hours drivers
24H Series drivers
GT4 European Series drivers